A state councillor is a high-ranking position within the State Council, the executive organ of the Chinese government (comparable to a cabinet). It ranks immediately below the Vice-Premiers and above the ministers of various departments. Similar to minister without portfolio, the position carries duties unspecified at the time of appointment, although state councillor may also be appointed to head a department. The position was created during the May 1982 restructuring of the State Council, when eleven state councillors were appointed, ten of whom were vice premiers until then.

Role 
In theory, state councillors are to assist the Premier and Vice-Premiers  to oversee various government portfolios. They can also represent the State Council (and in turn, Government of China) on foreign visits. State councillors are part of a Standing Meeting of the State Council, alongside the Premier, Vice-Premiers, and the Secretary General of the State Council. The organ holds weekly meetings. In practice, a state councillor's portfolios can be very wide-ranging. 

State councillors often accompany China's higher dignitaries on trips abroad - as was the case with State Councillor Tang Jiaxuan from 2003–2008, and Dai Bingguo from 2008–2013. Dai also became China's representative at the 2009 G8 summit in Italy when President Hu Jintao decided to cut short his attendance to return to China in order to deal with the July 2009 Ürümqi riots.

List of state councillors 
 5th State Council (1982–1983)
The position was created during the May 1982 restructuring of the State Council. Eleven state councillors were appointed, ten of whom were vice premiers until then, the only exception being Zhang Jingfu.
 Yu Qiuli
 Geng Biao
 Fang Yi
 Gu Mu
 Kang Shi'en
 Chen Muhua
 Bo Yibo
 Ji Pengfei
 Huang Hua
 Zhang Jingfu
 Zhang Aiping

 6th State Council (1983–1988)
 Fang Yi
 Gu Mu
 Kang Shi'en
 Chen Muhua
 Ji Pengfei
 Zhang Jingfu
 Zhang Aiping
 Wu Xueqian
 Wang Bingqian
 Song Ping
 Song Jian

 7th State Council (1988–1993)
 Li Tieying
 Qin Jiwei
 Wang Bingqian
 Song Jian
 Wang Fang
 Zou Jiahua
 Li Guixian
 Chen Xitong
 Chen Junsheng
 Qian Qichen

 8th State Council (1993–1998)
 Li Tieying
 Chi Haotian
 Song Jian
 Li Guixian
 Chen Junsheng
 Ismail Amat
 Peng Peiyun
 Luo Gan - Secretary-General of the State Council

 9th State Council (1998–2003)
 Chi Haotian
 Luo Gan
 Ismail Amat
 Wu Yi
 Wang Zhongyu - Secretary-General of the State Council

 10th State Council (2003–2008)

 11th State Council (2008–2013)

 12th State Council (2013–2018)

 13th State Council (2018–2023)

References

External links 
 Governing Laws of the State Council